The Peel Sessions is a live album recorded by American punk rock band Babes in Toyland, released in 1992. It was produced by Dale "Buffin" Griffin and released by Strange Fruit Records/Dutch East India Trading. Babes in Toyland later self-released a 7" of four other songs from their 1992 Peel Sessions. Included on the 7" were "Jungle Train," "Right Now," "Sometimes," and "Magic Flute." It was re-released as The BBC John Peel Sessions, 1990–1992 in 2001.

Track listing 
All song by Babes in Toyland
"Catatonic" - 2:53
"Ripe" - 3:36
"Primus" - 3:58
"Spit to See the Shine" - 2:40
"Pearl" - 2:03
"Dogg" - 5:11
"Laugh My Head Off" - 3:30
"Mad Pilot" - 2:50

Personnel
Kat Bjellandvocals, guitar
Lori Barberodrums, vocals 
Michelle Leonbass

References

Babes in Toyland (band) compilation albums
Babes in Toyland
1992 live albums
1992 compilation albums
Live grunge albums
1992 EPs
Live EPs
Grunge compilation albums